LDS may refer to:

Organizations
 LDS Hospital, Salt Lake City, Utah, US

Religion
 Latter Day Saint movement (LDS movement), a collection of independent church groups
The Church of Jesus Christ of Latter-day Saints, the largest group within the Latter Day Saint movement
 Latvijas Dievturu Sadraudze, a Latvian neopagan organization

Politics
 Liberal Democracy of Slovenia, a political party in Slovenia
 Linyon Demokratik Seselwa, a political party in Seychelles

Science, technology and engineering
 Laser direct structuring, a manufacturing method
 LDS fluid, a Citroën hydraulic fluid
 LDS (automobile), South African racing cars
 Leak detection system, for fluids
 Lipodermatosclerosis, a skin and connective tissue disease, affecting the lower extremities
 Lymphedema–distichiasis syndrome, a genetic disorder of eyelashes and lymphatic system
 Loeys–Dietz syndrome, a genetic disorder affecting connective tissue
 LDS-1 (Line Drawing System-1), an early computer graphics system
 Lithium dodecyl sulfate (LDS), an anionic detergent and surfactant used in protein electrophoresis and chromatography

Places
 Yichun Lindu Airport (IATA airport code), China
 Leeds railway station (National Rail station code), England
 Landkreis Dahme-Spreewald, a district in Germany

Other uses
 League Division Series, a round of playoffs in Major League Baseball
 Licentiate in Dental Surgery, a dental degree

See also
 LSD (disambiguation)